The following table is based on Federal Bureau of Investigation Uniform Crime Reports statistics.

The population numbers are based on U.S. Census estimates for the year end.  The number of murders includes nonnegligent manslaughter.  This list is based on the reporting agency.  In most cases the city and the reporting agency are identical.  However, in some cases such as Charlotte, Honolulu and Las Vegas, the reporting agency as more than one city.

Murder is the only statistic that all agencies are required to report.  Consequently, some agencies do not report all the crimes.  If components are missing the total is adjusted to "0."

Note about population
Data are voluntarily submitted by each jurisdiction and some jurisdictions do not appear in the table because they either did not submit data or they did not meet deadlines.

According to the FBI website has this disclaimer on population estimates:

For the 2008 population estimates used in this table, the FBI computed individual rates of growth from one year to the next for every city/town and county using 2000 decennial population counts and 2001 through 2007 population estimates from the U.S. Census Bureau. Each agency’s rates of growth were averaged; that average was then applied and added to its 2007 Census population estimate to derive the agency’s 2008 population estimate.

2014 Calendar Year Ratios of Crime Per 100,000 Population

Criticism of ranking crime data 
The FBI web site recommends against using its data for ranking because these rankings lead to simplistic and/or incomplete analyses that often create misleading perceptions adversely affecting cities and counties, along with their residents. The FBI web site also recommends against using its data to judge how effective law enforcement agencies are, since there are many factors that influence crime rates other than law enforcement.

In November 2007, the executive board of the American Society of Criminology (ASC) went further than the FBI itself, and approved a resolution opposing not only the use of the ratings to judge police departments, but also opposing any development of city crime rankings from FBI Uniform Crime Reports (UCRs) at all. The resolution opposed these rankings on the grounds that they "fail to account for the many conditions affecting crime rates" and "divert attention from the individual and community characteristics that elevate crime in all cities", though it did not provide sources or further elaborate on these claims. The resolution states the rankings "represent an irresponsible misuse of the data and do groundless harm to many communities" and "work against a key goal of our society, which is a better understanding of crime-related issues by both scientists and the public".

The U.S. Conference of Mayors passed a similar statement, which also committed the Conference to working with the FBI and the U.S. Department of Justice "to educate reporters, elected officials, and citizens on what the (UCR) data means and doesn't mean."

Criticism of comparing crime rates 

Crime rates per capita might also be biased by population size depending on the crime type. This misrepresentation occurs because rates per capita assume that crime increases at the same pace as the number of people in an area. When this linear assumption does not hold, rates per capita still have population effects. In these nonlinear cases, per capita rates can inflate or deflate the representation of crime in cities, introducing an artifactual bias into rankings. Therefore, it is necessary to test for linearity before comparing crime rates of cities of different sizes.

Other city crime rates
United States cities by crime rate, populations 250,000+
United States cities by crime rate (100,000 - 250,000)

See also
 List of U.S. states and territories by violent crime rate
 List of U.S. states and territories by intentional homicide rate
List of cities by murder rate
Homicide in world cities
Crime in the United States

References

Crime rates in the United States